Battle Island Light is a lighthouse on the Canadian shore of Lake Superior.

When built, it operated as a bright flash, four-second interval, bright flash, four-second interval, and then bright flash, 16-second interval, with a concurrent lower-strength light operating at 12-seconds constant/ 12 seconds eclipsed. Its fog horn (originally referred to as a "fog diaphone") blasted for 3½ seconds and was then silent for 26½ seconds.
The lighthouse was rebuilt in 1915–16 in response to increased demand from local wood pulp carriers and commercial fishing boats.

See also
 List of lighthouses in Ontario
List of lighthouses in Canada

References

External links
 Aids to Navigation Canadian Coast Guard

Lighthouses completed in 1877
Lighthouses in Ontario
1877 establishments in Ontario